WXXC (106.9 FM "Star 106.9") is a 50,000 watt Class B radio station licensed to Marion, Indiana and serving the Muncie-Marion Arbitron market.  Studios and offices are located at 820 S. Pennsylvania St. in Marion, IN.  The station features a hot adult contemporary format mainly consisting of hits from the 2000s to present. The station is currently owned by Hoosier AM/FM.

History
The station signed on in 1948 as WMRI and featured a beautiful music format.  In the 1990s, WMRI was owned by Bomar Broadcasting, which made WMRI the flagship station of their mini-network of easy listening stations throughout Indiana.  Stations in this network included WLEZ (now WBOW) Terre Haute, WEZV (now WBPE) in Lafayette, and WYEZ (now WHPZ) in South Bend.  WYEZ was the first network station sold and went to LeSEA Broadcasting.  WEZV was sold in 1998 to Artistic Media Partners, and WLEZ was sold to Crossroads Communications in the early 2000s.  Bomar sold WMRI shortly thereafter to Mid-America Radio, owners of crosstown country outlet WCJC and oldies WBAT, (now Hoosier AM/FM LLC).

Programming
WMRI's programming mainly consisted of beautiful music (easy listening) for much of its existence.  However the format was aging and so were its faithful listeners.  WMRI held on to the B/EZ format for much longer than a majority of stations nationwide as many dropped or gradually moved away from the format by the mid to late 1980s.

In the fall of 1998, WMRI ended its beautiful music run and flipped to adult contemporary as "Lite Rock 106.9".  Their lone existing network station in Terre Haute also flipped to AC as "Lite Rock 102.7".  The format consisted of Marion-based deejays by day and satellite programming from Westwood One's (now Dial Global) Bright AC format at night.  Since Bright AC was a Hot AC format and WMRI itself featured a much softer blend of music by day, the station switched affiliations to Jones Radio Networks 'AC' format (now part of Dial Global) to create format uniformity all day.

In the early 2000s, WLEZ was sold to a Terre Haute-based company and ended Bomar's radio network stint.  The programming structure on WMRI, however, continued.  The only exception was for on-air personalities who now had the freedom to talk about station promotions and other Marion-based mentions. The mix of local and satellite content through Jones continued until 2006 when the format was dropped in favor of classic hits.  The WMRI calls were moved to their AM sister station (formerly WGOM), which took on an adult standards format, as 106.9 became WXXC.

On November 18, 2013 the station dropped the branding "106.9 WXXC" and the Classic Hits format and became "Star 106.9" and now features an Adult Contemporary format, playing hits from "The Oldies to Now."

The station features a line-up of Jackson Blue (12AM-5AM), Elvis Duran and the Morning Show (5-10AM) in the mornings, Annette Miller (10AM-2PM) in the afternoons, David (2-7PM) in the evenings, and Jackie from 7PM to Midnight.

External links

Radio stations established in 1948
XXC